John Bulaitis (26 June 1933 – 25 December 2010) was a Lithuanian prelate of the Catholic Church who served in the diplomatic service of the Holy See. He served terms as Apostolic Nuncio to several countries between 1981 and 2008.

John Bulaitis, the prelate of the Catholic Church, is sometimes confused with John Bulaitis, Senior Lecturer in History at Canterbury Christ Church University, author of Communism in Rural France and Maurice Thorez: A Biography. https://www.canterbury.ac.uk/arts-and-humanities/school-of-humanities/Staff/Profile.aspx?staff=bbf7063b8e4bf6c6

Born in London, United Kingdom, Bulaitis was ordained a priest for the Roman Catholic Diocese of Kaišiadorys, Lithuania, in 1958.

To prepare for a career in the diplomatic service he entered the program of study at the Pontifical Ecclesiastical Academy in 1961.

In 1981, he was named titular archbishop of Narona and apostolic nuncio to Chad and Apostolic Pro-Nuncio to the Central African Republic and the Republic of the Congo.

On 11 July 1987, he was named Apostolic Pro-Nuncio to Iran.

On 30 November 1991, he was named Apostolic Pro-Nuncio to Korea and he was given in addition the position of Apostolic Nuncio to Mongolia on 8 September 1992.

He was appointed apostolic nuncio to Albania on 25 March 1997.

Bulaitis retired in 2008.

References

External links
Catholic Hierarchy: Archbishop John Bulaitis

Lithuanian Roman Catholic archbishops
Roman Catholic titular archbishops
Apostolic Nuncios to Albania
Apostolic Nuncios to Mongolia
Apostolic Nuncios to South Korea
Apostolic Nuncios to Chad
Apostolic Nuncios to the Central African Republic
1933 births
2010 deaths
Apostolic Nuncios to the Republic of the Congo
Apostolic Nuncios to Iran